Slovenia competed at the 2003 World Championships in Athletics which were held from 23 to 31 August 2003 in the Stade de France in Saint-Denis, France. The country was represented by 13 athletes, six men and seven women.

Results

Key
Q = Qualified for the next round
q = Qualified for the next round as a fastest loser or, in field events, by position without achieving the qualifying target
NR = National record
PB = Personal best
SB = Season's best
N/A = Round not applicable for the event

Men
Track and road events

Field events

Women
Track and road events

References

World Championships in Athletics
Slovenia at the World Championships in Athletics